Owen Robert Dunell (15 July 1856 – 21 October 1929) was a South African cricketer who captained his country in its first Test match in 1888/89, as well as an early association footballer who played for Oxford University at the 1877 FA Cup Final.

Education
Although born in Port Elizabeth, Dunell was educated in England at Eton College and at Trinity College, Oxford, where he graduated BA in 1878 and Master of Arts in 1883.

Cricket career
He played only three first-class games, two of them Test matches, although he was captain only in the first, being replaced by William Milton for the second game. His only other first-class match was for Port Elizabeth against Natal the following year.

Football career
He also played football in his youth, in position of full back, for Oxford University as well as two matches as a football 'Blue' with Cambridge University in 1877 and 1878. C.W. Alcock described him as "a very safe and neat kick; a thoroughly reliable back, though a little wanting, perhaps, in pace".  He appeared in the 1877 FA Cup Final against Wanderers at Kennington Oval, which his team lost. He was a member of the Football Association committee in 1878.

Later life
Dunell spent some time in business in Natal, but settled in England, living at New Alresford, Hampshire, ultimately in South Kensington, London.  He died, while visiting, in Lyon, France, at the age of 73. His son, Henry, also played first-class cricket.

References

External links

1856 births
1929 deaths
Cricketers from Port Elizabeth
South African soccer players
South African expatriate soccer players
Expatriate footballers in England
Eastern Province cricketers
South Africa Test cricketers
South Africa Test cricket captains
South African cricketers
People educated at Eton College
Alumni of Trinity College, Oxford
Oxford University A.F.C. players
Association football defenders
FA Cup Final players